The 1971 Isle of Man TT was a motorcycle event held on 12 June 1971, on the 37-mile Snaefell Mountain course on the Isle of Man between Great Britain and Ireland. It was the third round of the F.I.M. 1971 Grand Prix motorcycle racing season (now MotoGP).

The unbelievable happened in 1971 - Agostini's MV broke down on the first lap of the Junior. The crowd cheered when it was announced that the Italian had stopped at Ramsey with engine problems. His demise produced a dramatic race in which many of the favourites either crashed or broke down.

Yamaha's Phil Read led Alan Barnett, Rod Gould and Dudley Robinson at the end of the first lap. Gould then crashed at Quarterbridge, but continued. On lap three Barnett came off at Glen Helen, and a lap later Read retired with chassis problems. With one lap to go Robinson led Yorkshireman Tony Jefferies, riding a Yamsel, but he crashed at Rhencullen, so Jefferies came home with 37 seconds to spare from newcomers Gordon Pantall, with Bill Smith third.

Agostini had no such problems in the Senior, which was postponed by a day because of bad weather. Despite spending nearly two minutes in the pits to rectify carburation problems, he won comfortably from Peter Williams (Arter Matchless) and Frank Perris on a Suzuki.

The Yamaha twins dominated the 250cc race, which was reduced to four laps. Phil Read led all the way when his main challenger Peter Williams's MZ expired at the end of the first lap. Barry Randle and Alan Barnett completed a Yamaha clean sweep.

Barry Sheene made his one and only TT appearance in the 125cc race, but slipped off his Suzuki at Quarterbridge on the second lap while lying second in appalling conditions. The race was won by Chas Mortimer, riding a Yamaha, at the slowest 125cc average on the Mountain Course since 1953.

A new three-lap Formula 750 race was introduced to provide a class to accommodate the popular British 750cc racing machines. Tony Jefferies led throughout on a works Triumph after a splendid battle with the BSA of Ray Pickrell and the Norton of Peter Williams.

Pickrell gained revenge in the 750cc class of the Production race. Riding a Triumph, he was involved in a tremendous duel with Williams until the Norton stopped on the third lap at the Bungalow. Pickrell was a comfortable winner from Jefferies and the BSA of Bob Heath. John Williams and Bill Smith brought Honda success in both the 500 and 250cc classes with dominant victories.

Siggi Schauzu won his fifth TT after a superb duel with BMW teammate George Auerbacher in the World Championship sidecar race. Earlier in the week Auerbacher had secured his first TT victory in the 750cc sidecar event after ten years of trying. Schauzu broke the lap record from a standing start but dropped out on the second lap.

1971 Isle of Man Lightweight TT 125cc final standings
3 Laps (113.00 Miles) Mountain Course.

1971 Isle of Man Lightweight TT 250cc final standings
4 Laps (150.92 Miles) Mountain Course.

1971 Isle of Man Junior TT 350cc final standings
5 Laps (188.65 Miles) Mountain Course.

1971 Isle of Man Senior TT 500cc final standings
6 Laps (236.38 Miles) Mountain Course.

1971 Isle of Man Sidecar 500cc TT final standings
3 Laps (113.00 Miles) Mountain Course.

Non-championship races

1971 Isle of Man Production 750 cc TT final standings
3 Laps (113.00 Miles) Mountain Course.

1971 Isle of Man Production 500 cc TT final standings
3 Laps (113.00 Miles) Mountain Course.

1971 Isle of Man Sidecar 750cc TT final standings
3 Laps (113.00 Miles) Mountain Course.

1971 Isle of Man Production 250 cc TT final standings
3 Laps (113.00 Miles) Mountain Course.

1971 Isle of Man Formula 1 750 cc TT final standings
3 Laps (113.00 Miles) Mountain Course.

References

External links
 Detailed race results
 Mountain Course map

Isle of Man Tt
Tourist Trophy
Isle of Man TT
Isle of Man TT